Tomassetti is an Italian surname that may refer to
Art Tomassetti (born 1964), United States Marine Corps colonel and test pilot
Stefano Tomassetti (born 1980), Italian darts player
Vittorio Tomassetti (1930–2008), Italian Roman Catholic bishop

See also
Tomasetti (disambiguation)

Italian-language surnames
Patronymic surnames
Surnames from given names